Neohylus is a genus of longhorn beetles of the subfamily Lamiinae, containing the following species:

 Neohylus alexandrei Martins & Galileo, 2010
 Neohylus dubius (Dillon & Dillon, 1945)

References

Onciderini